Urup may refer to:
Urup, one of the Kuril Islands north of Japan
Urup, Afghanistan
Urup (river), a river in North Caucasus, Russia
Urup (village), a former urban-type settlement in the Karachay–Cherkess Republic, Russia; since 1997—a village